is the Emperor Emeritus of Japan who reigned as the 125th Emperor of Japan from 7 January 1989 until his abdication on 30 April 2019. He presided over the  era, Heisei being an expression of achieving peace worldwide.

Born in 1933, Akihito is the first son of Emperor Shōwa and Empress Kōjun. During the Second World War, he moved out of Tokyo with his classmates, and remained in Nikkō until 1945. In 1952, his Coming-of-Age ceremony and investiture as crown prince were held, and he began to undertake official duties in his capacity as crown prince. The next year, he made his first journey overseas and represented Japan at the coronation of Elizabeth II, Queen of the United Kingdom. He completed his university education in 1956. In 1959, he married Michiko Shōda, a Catholic; it was the first imperial wedding to be televised in Japan, drawing about 15 million viewers. The couple have three children: Naruhito, Fumihito, and Sayako.

Upon the death of his father in 1989, Akihito succeeded to the Chrysanthemum Throne. His enthronement ceremony followed in 1990. He has made efforts to bring the imperial family closer to the Japanese people, and has made official visits to all forty-seven prefectures of Japan and to many of the remote islands of Japan. He has a keen interest in natural life and conservation, as well as Japanese and world history. Akihito abdicated in 2019, citing his advanced age and declining health, and assumed the title Emperor Emeritus. He was succeeded by his eldest son, Naruhito. A new era, was established then. At age , Akihito is the longest-lived verifiable Japanese emperor in recorded history. During Akihito's reign, he was served by 17 prime ministers beginning with Noboru Takeshita and ending with Shinzo Abe.

Name

The era of Akihito's reign from 1989 to 2019 bore the era name , and according to custom he will be posthumously renamed  as the 125th emperor of Japan by order of the Cabinet.

Upon Akihito's abdication on 30 April 2019, he received the title . Still he is never referred to by his own name, but instead as "His Majesty the Emperor Emeritus" or "His Majesty".

Early life and education

 was born on 23 December 1933 at 6:39 am in the Tokyo Imperial Palace as the fifth child and eldest son of Emperor Shōwa and Empress Kōjun. Titled  as a child, Akihito was educated by private tutors prior to attending the elementary and secondary departments of the Peers' School (Gakushūin) from 1940 to 1952. At the request of his father, he did not receive a commission as an army officer, unlike his predecessors.

During the American firebombing raids on Tokyo in March 1945 during World War II, Akihito and his younger brother Prince Masahito were evacuated from the city. Akihito was tutored in the English language and Western manners by Elizabeth Gray Vining during the Allied occupation of Japan, and later briefly studied at the department of political science at Gakushuin University in Tokyo, though he never received a degree.

Akihito was the heir apparent to the Chrysanthemum Throne from birth. His formal  took place at the Tokyo Imperial Palace on 10 November 1952. In June 1953, Akihito represented Japan at the coronation of Queen Elizabeth II in London in his first journey abroad. He later completed his university education as a special student in 1956.

Marriage and family

In August 1957, Akihito met Michiko Shōda on a tennis court at Karuizawa near Nagano. Initially there was little enthusiasm for the couple's relationship; Michiko Shōda was considered too low class for the young Crown Prince and had been educated in a Catholic environment. Therefore, in September 1958, she was sent away to Brussels to attend an international conference of the Alumnae du Sacré-Cœur. The Crown Prince was determined to keep in contact with his girlfriend but didn't want to create a diplomatic incident. Therefore, he contacted the young King Baudouin of Belgium to send his messages directly to his loved one. Later King Baudouin also negotiated the marriage of the couple with the Emperor directly stating that if the Crown Prince is happy with Michiko, he would be a better emperor later on.

The Imperial Household Council formally approved the engagement of the Crown Prince to Michiko Shōda on 27 November 1958. The announcement of the then-Crown Prince Akihito's engagement and forthcoming marriage to Michiko Shōda drew opposition from traditionalist groups, because Shōda came from a Catholic family. Although Shōda was never baptized, she had been educated in Catholic schools and seemed to share her parents' faith.  Rumors also speculated that Prince Akihito's mother, Empress Kōjun had opposed the engagement. After the death of Empress Kōjun on 16 June 2000, Reuters reported that she was one of the strongest opponents of her son's marriage, and that in the 1960s, she had driven her daughter-in-law and grandchildren to depression by persistently accusing Shōda of not being suitable for her son. At that time, the media presented their encounter as a real "fairy tale", or the "romance of the tennis court". It was the first time a commoner had married into the Imperial Family, breaking more than 2,600 years of tradition. The engagement ceremony took place on 14 January 1959, and the marriage on 10 April 1959.

Akihito and Michiko had three children: two sons Naruhito (born 23 February 1960 and titled Prince Hiro; later the 126th Emperor of Japan) and Fumihito (born 30 November 1965 and titled Prince Aya; later Prince Akishino and subsequently the Crown Prince of Japan), and a daughter Sayako Kuroda (born 18 April 1969 and titled Princess Nori before marriage). The three children were born at the Imperial Household Agency Hospital at the Tokyo Imperial Palace.

Crown Prince Akihito and Crown Princess Michiko made official visits to thirty-seven countries. As an Imperial Prince, Akihito compared the role of Japanese royalty to that of a robot. He expressed the desire to help bring the Imperial family closer to the people of Japan.

Reign

Upon the death of Emperor Shōwa on 7 January 1989, Akihito acceded to the throne, becoming the 125th Emperor of Japan. The enthronement ceremony took place on 12 November 1990. In 1998, during a state visit to the United Kingdom, he was invested with the UK Order of the Garter.

Under the Constitution of Japan, Akihito's role was entirely representative and ceremonial in nature, without even a nominal role in government; indeed, he was not allowed to make political statements. He was limited to acting in matters of state as delineated in the Constitution. Even in those matters, he was bound by the requirements of the Constitution and the binding advice of the Cabinet. For instance, while he formally appointed the Prime Minister, he was required to appoint the person designated by the Diet.

Despite being strictly constrained by his constitutional position, he also issued several wide-ranging statements of remorse to Asian countries, for their suffering under Japanese occupation, beginning with an expression of remorse to China made in April 1989, three months after the death of his father, Emperor Shōwa.

On 23 December 2001, during his annual birthday meeting with reporters, the Emperor, in response to a reporter's question about tensions with South Korea, remarked that he felt a kinship with Koreans and went on to explain that, in the Shoku Nihongi, the mother of Emperor Kammu (736–806) is related to Muryeong of Korea, King of Baekje, a fact that was considered taboo for discussion.

In June 2005, the Emperor Akihito and the Empress Michiko visited the island of Saipan (part of the Northern Mariana Islands, a U.S. territory), the site of a battle in the World War II from 15 June to 9 July 1944 (known as the Battle of Saipan). Accompanied by Empress Michiko, he offered prayers and flowers at several memorials, honoring not only the Japanese who died, but also American servicemen, Korean laborers, and local islanders. It was the first trip by a Japanese monarch to a World War II battlefield abroad. The Saipan journey was received with high praise by the Japanese people, as were the Emperor's visits to war memorials in Tokyo, Hiroshima Prefecture, Nagasaki Prefecture and Okinawa Prefecture in 1995.

After succeeding to the throne, Akihito made an effort to bring the Imperial family closer to the Japanese people. He and Michiko made official visits to eighteen countries and to all forty-seven Prefectures of Japan. Akihito has never visited Yasukuni Shrine, continuing his predecessor's boycott from 1978, due to its enshrinement of war criminals.

On 6 September 2006, the Emperor celebrated the birth of his first grandson, Prince Hisahito, the third child of the Emperor's younger son. Prince Hisahito was the first male heir born to the Japanese imperial family in 41 years (since his father Prince Akishino) and could avert the Japanese imperial succession crisis, as the only child of the Emperor's elder son, the then Crown Prince Naruhito, is his daughter, Princess Aiko, who is not eligible for the throne under Japan's male-only succession law. The birth of Prince Hisahito meant that proposed changes to the law to allow Aiko to ascend the Chrysanthemum Throne were dropped.

Recently, in response to the 2011 Tōhoku earthquake and tsunami and the Fukushima I nuclear crisis, the Emperor made  urging his people not to give up hope and to help each other.

On 13 July 2016, national broadcaster NHK reported that the then 82-year-old Emperor intended to abdicate in favor of his eldest son Crown Prince Naruhito within a few years, citing his age. An abdication within the Imperial Family had not occurred since Emperor Kōkaku in 1817. However, senior officials within the Imperial Household Agency denied that there was any official plan for the monarch to abdicate. Abdication by the Emperor required an amendment to the Imperial Household Law, which had no provisions for such a move. On 8 August 2016, the Emperor gave a rare televised address, where he emphasized his advanced age and declining health; this address was interpreted as an implication of his intention to abdicate.

On 19 May 2017, the bill that would allow Akihito to abdicate was issued by the Cabinet of Japan. On 8 June 2017, the National Diet passed it, whereupon it became known as the Emperor Abdication Law. This commenced government preparations to hand the position over to Naruhito. Prime Minister Shinzo Abe announced in December 2017 that the 125th Emperor Akihito would abdicate at the end of 30 April 2019, and that the 126th Emperor Naruhito's reign would begin as of 1 May 2019.

Post-abdication and later years
On 19 March 2020, Emperor emeritus Akihito and his wife Empress emerita Michiko moved out of the Imperial Palace, marking their first public appearance since the abdication. On 31 March, they moved in to the Takanawa Residence.

In December 2021, Akihito celebrated his 88th birthday (beiju), making him the longest-living verifiable Japanese emperor in recorded history.

Health
Emperor Akihito underwent surgery for prostate cancer on 14 January 2003. Later in 2011 he was admitted to hospital suffering from pneumonia. In February 2012, it was announced that the Emperor would be having a coronary examination; he underwent successful heart bypass surgery on 18 February 2012. In July 2018, he suffered from nausea and dizziness due to insufficient blood flow to his brain. In January 2020, he temporarily lost consciousness and collapsed at his residence, though "no abnormalities" were detected in his brain.
He was diagnosed with heart failure in July 2022.

Issue
Akihito and Michiko have three children (two sons and a daughter).

Ichthyological research

In extension of his father's interest in marine biology, who published taxonomic works on the Hydrozoa, the Emperor emeritus is a published ichthyological researcher, and has specialized in studies within the taxonomy of the family Gobiidae. He has written papers for scholarly journals such as Gene, Ichthyological Research, and the Japanese Journal of Ichthyology.
He has also written papers about the history of science during the Edo and Meiji eras, which were published in Science and Nature. In 2005, a newly described goby was named Exyrias akihito in his honour, and in 2007 a genus Akihito of gobies native to Vanuatu also received his name. In 2021, the Imperial Household Agency announced Akihito had discovered two new species of goby fish. The discovery was cataloged in an English-language journal published by the Ichthyological Society of Japan.

In 1965, then-Crown Prince Akihito sent 50 Nile tilapia to Thai emperor Bhumibol Adulyadej in response to a request for fish that could solve malnutrition issues in the country. The species has since become a major food source in Thailand and a major export.

  Member of the Ichthyological Society of Japan
  Foreign member of the Linnean Society of London (1980)
  Honorary member of the Linnean Society of London (1986)
  Research associate of the Australian Museum
  Honorary member of the Zoological Society of London (1992)
  Honorary member of the Research Institute for Natural Science of Argentina (1997)
  Honorary degree of the Uppsala University (2007)

Honours

a FR Yugoslavia split into Serbia and Montenegro. As of 2006 this order is аbolished.
b Zaire is now the Democratic Republic of the Congo.

Other awards
 The Royal Society King Charles II Medal
 Golden Pheasant Award of the Scout Association of Japan (1971)

Overseas visits

The following table includes the official visits made by Emperor Akihito, along with Empress Michiko, following succession to the throne on 7 January 1989. The list includes all the visits made up to 31 December 2017. Although Empress Michiko has made two official visits on her own, in 2002 (to Switzerland) and 2014 (to Belgium), they did not include the Emperor and are not included in this table.

Ancestry

Patrilineal descent

Akihito's patriline is the line from which he is descended father to son.

Patrilineal descent is the principle behind membership in royal houses, as it can be traced back through the generations, which means that Akihito is a member of the Imperial House of Japan.

Imperial House of Japan

 Descent prior to Keitai is unclear to modern historians, but traditionally traced back patrilineally to Emperor Jimmu
 Emperor Keitai, ca. 450–534
 Emperor Kinmei, 509–571
 Emperor Bidatsu, 538–585
 Prince Oshisaka, ca. 556–???
 Emperor Jomei, 593–641
 Emperor Tenji, 626–671
 Prince Shiki, ???–716
 Emperor Kōnin, 709–786
 Emperor Kanmu, 737–806
 Emperor Saga, 786–842
 Emperor Ninmyō, 810–850
 Emperor Kōkō, 830–867
 Emperor Uda, 867–931
 Emperor Daigo, 885–930
 Emperor Murakami, 926–967
 Emperor En'yū, 959–991
 Emperor Ichijō, 980–1011
 Emperor Go-Suzaku, 1009–1045
 Emperor Go-Sanjō, 1034–1073
 Emperor Shirakawa, 1053–1129
 Emperor Horikawa, 1079–1107
 Emperor Toba, 1103–1156
 Emperor Go-Shirakawa, 1127–1192
 Emperor Takakura, 1161–1181
 Emperor Go-Toba, 1180–1239
 Emperor Tsuchimikado, 1196–1231
 Emperor Go-Saga, 1220–1272
 Emperor Go-Fukakusa, 1243–1304
 Emperor Fushimi, 1265–1317
 Emperor Go-Fushimi, 1288–1336
 Emperor Kōgon, 1313–1364
 Emperor Sukō, 1334–1398
 Prince Yoshihito Fushimi, 1351–1416
 Prince Sadafusa Fushimi, 1372–1456
 Emperor Go-Hanazono, 1419–1471
 Emperor Go-Tsuchimikado, 1442–1500
 Emperor Go-Kashiwabara, 1464–1526
 Emperor Go-Nara, 1495–1557
 Emperor Ōgimachi, 1517–1593
 Prince Masahito, 1552–1586
 Emperor Go-Yōzei, 1572–1617
 Emperor Go-Mizunoo, 1596–1680
 Emperor Reigen, 1654–1732
 Emperor Higashiyama, 1675–1710
 Prince Naohito Kanin, 1704–1753
 Prince Sukehito Kanin, 1733–1794
 Emperor Kōkaku, 1771–1840
 Emperor Ninkō, 1800–1846
 Emperor Kōmei, 1831–1867
 Emperor Meiji, 1852–1912
 Emperor Taishō, 1879–1926
 Emperor Shōwa, 1901–1989
 Emperor Akihito, b. 1933

See also
 The Emperor's Birthday
 Imperial Household Agency
 Imperial House of Japan
 Japanese era name
 List of Emperors of Japan

References

External links

 Their Majesties the Emperor emeritus and Empress emerita at the Imperial Household Agency website
 Complete transcript (U.S. English and Japanese) and audio mp3 and video of 'Do Not Lose Hope' Address to the Nation at AmericanRhetoric.com

1933 births
20th-century Japanese monarchs
21st-century Japanese monarchs
Articles containing video clips

Japanese emperors
Japanese environmentalists
Japanese ichthyologists
Japanese philanthropists
Japanese princes
Japanese Shintoists
Gakushuin University alumni
Living people
Japanese retired emperors
People from Tokyo
Collars of the Order of the White Lion
Grand Collars of the Order of Lakandula
Grand Collars of the Order of Prince Henry
Grand Collars of the Order of Saint James of the Sword
Recipients of the Collar of the Order of the Cross of Terra Mariana
Grand Cordons of the Order of Valour
Grand Croix of the Légion d'honneur
Grand Crosses of the National Order of Mali
Grand Crosses of the Order of the Sun of Peru
Grand Crosses Special Class of the Order of Merit of the Federal Republic of Germany
Grand Crosses with Chain of the Order of Merit of the Republic of Hungary (civil)
Grand Crosses with Golden Chain of the Order of Vytautas the Great
Honorary Knights Grand Cross of the Royal Victorian Order
Knights Grand Cross with Collar of the Order of Merit of the Italian Republic
Chief Commanders of the Philippine Legion of Honor
Grand Commanders of the Order of the Federal Republic
Chiefs of the Order of the Golden Heart of Kenya
Extra Knights Companion of the Garter
Knights of the Golden Fleece of Spain
Opposition to World War II
Recipients of the Grand Star of the Decoration for Services to the Republic of Austria
Recipients of the Order of Culture
Recipients of the Order of Prince Yaroslav the Wise, 1st class
Recipients of the Order of the Falcon
Recipients of the Order of the Rising Sun with Paulownia Flowers
Recipients of the Order of the Sacred Treasure, 1st class
Recipients of the Order of the White Eagle (Poland)
Recipients of orders, decorations, and medals of Ethiopia